Skånemejerier, based in Skåne County, is a Swedish cooperative and Sweden's largest producers of dairy products after Arla Foods and Milko. Founded in 1964, the company's products include milk, cream, yoghurt, soured milk, soured cream, cheese, and crème fraiche. Skånemejerier is a subsidiary of the multinational dairy products corporation Lactalis since 2012.

References

Dairy products companies of Sweden
Swedish companies established in 1964
Companies based in Malmö
Agricultural cooperatives
Food and drink companies of Sweden
Swedish brands
20th-century establishments in Skåne County